Zane Kalemba (born December 19, 1985) is an American former professional ice hockey goaltender who most recently for Manchester Storm in the Elite Ice Hockey League.

Kalemba grew up in Saddle Brook, New Jersey.  He played youth hockey with the New Jersey Devils Youth Hockey Club where he won a USA Hockey Bantam National Championship in 2001.  He attended Bergen Catholic High School before transferring to the Hotchkiss School at the start of his sophomore year.

Prior to turning professional, Kalemba attended the Princeton University where he played four seasons with the Princeton Tigers men's ice hockey team which competes in NCAA's Division I in the ECAC conference.

On March 8, 2018, Kalemba signed an emergency professional tryout contract with the Winnipeg Jets of the National Hockey League after goaltender Michael Hutchinson's flight was delayed, causing him to arrive late to the game.

Awards and honors

References

External links 

1985 births
American men's ice hockey goaltenders
American people of Polish descent
Bergen Catholic High School alumni
Bloomington Blaze (CHL) players
Elmira Jackals (ECHL) players
Flin Flon Bombers players
Green Bay Gamblers players
Hotchkiss School alumni
Ice hockey players from New Jersey
Living people
Missouri Mavericks players
People from Saddle Brook, New Jersey
Princeton Tigers men's ice hockey players
Reading Royals players
Sportspeople from Bergen County, New Jersey
Stockton Thunder players
Tri-City Storm players
Manchester Storm (2015–) players
AHCA Division I men's ice hockey All-Americans